is Fayray's 20th single. It was released on September 27, 2006, and peaked at #79. The song was used as the theme song for the NHK morning drama "Imo Tako Nankin". The coupled song is a cover of Hedy West's "500 Miles".

Track listing
ひとりよりふたり (Hitori Yori Futari; Together rather than alone)
500 Miles

Charts 
"Hitori Yori Futari" - Oricon Sales Chart (Japan)

External links
FAYRAY OFFICIAL SITE

2006 singles
Fayray songs
Songs written by Fayray
2006 songs